Marie Owens (December 21, 1853 – June 1927; born Marie Connolly aka Marie Connolly Owens) is believed to have been the first female police officer in the U.S. and the first female police officer in the Chicago Police Department, in 1891, retiring in 1923. Holding the rank of Sergeant, Owens enforced child labor and welfare laws. She was born and raised in Ottawa, Ontario, Canada, the daughter of Irish immigrants.

Career
Prior to working with the police, she was one of five female health inspectors employed in the city health department in 1889. When employed with police she reported to Capt. O’Brien.
In 1901 the Chicago Tribune described her position: "So Mrs. Marie Owens became 'Sergeant No. 97,' with the salary, star, and rating of a special police officer ... All over the city does this work take 'Sergeant No. 97'; from all parts of the working world come requests for her assistance, complaints for her investigation ... 'Sergeant No. 97' never invokes the string arm that is back of her unless all gentler methods have been proved inefficient ... in all her fifteen years of police experience never has 'Sergeant No. 97' found it necessary to come to a direct clash with an employer; never yet has she made an enemy of a child or parent."

Personal life
She had a younger brother named Brendan when she was seven years old.

She married Thomas Owens in 1879 when she was approximately 26 years old.

While Marie was still in her twenties, she and her husband Thomas moved to Chicago. He died of typhoid in February 1888 when Marie was approximately 35 years old. She was left alone to raise five children.

Marie named her first son after Charles Stewart Parnell.

She had a daughter who she went to live with when she retired.

Marie Owens died in New York City in June 1927, and was buried at Calvary Cemetery in Evanston, Illinois.

See also
Alice Stebbins Wells
Lola Baldwin

References

Chicago Police Department officers
1853 births
1927 deaths
American women police officers
Burials at Calvary Cemetery (Evanston, Illinois)
People from Chicago
People from Ottawa